Anopina eleonora is a moth of the family Tortricidae. It is found in the United States in Arizona, California, New Mexico and Texas.

The length of the forewings is 7–8 mm. The ground color of the forewings is grayish white, more or less sprinkled and/or transversely striated with dark brown. The basal quarter of the forewing is mottled with chestnut brown and orange yellowish, outlined by a broad, blackish brown fascia. The hindwings are fuscous, faintly grayish sprinkled.

References

Moths described in 1962
eleonora
Moths of North America